Galesh Kheyl or Galesh Khil may refer to:
 Galesh Kheyl, Rasht
 Galesh Khil, Rezvanshahr